{{DISPLAYTITLE:C27H31NO4}}
The molecular formula C27H31NO4 (molar mass: 433.54 g/mol) may refer to:

 Estrapronicate, a synthetic estrogen
 N-Phenethyl-14-ethoxymetopon, a potent analgesic
 14-Phenylpropoxymetopon, a potent analgesic